Vernon Milton Oech (May 31, 1913 – December 13, 1972) was a professional American football player. He was drafted in the fifth round of the 1936 NFL Draft. He played two seasons with the Chicago Bears of the National Football League. He was also a member of two collegiate national champion teams at the University of Minnesota.

External links

1913 births
1972 deaths
People from Golden Valley County, North Dakota
American football offensive guards
Montana Grizzlies football players
Minnesota Golden Gophers football players
Chicago Bears players
Players of American football from North Dakota